Ted Hill may refer to:
Ted Hill (mathematician) (Theodore Preston Hill, born 1943), U.S. mathematician
Ted Hill, Baron Hill of Wivenhoe (1899–1969), British trade unionist
Ted Hill (Australian communist) (Edward Fowler Hill, 1915–1988), Australian barrister and communist activist
Ted Hill (footballer) (1914–1986), Australian rules footballer
Ted Hill (rugby union) (born 1999), English rugby union player
Teddy Hill (1909–1978), American big band leader

See also
Edward Hill (disambiguation)
Theodore Hill (disambiguation)
Ted Hills, a fictional character from the BBC soap opera EastEnders